The 2019 mid-year rugby union internationals (also known as the summer internationals in the Northern Hemisphere) are international rugby union matches that are mostly played in the Southern Hemisphere during the June international window.

The matches are part of World Rugby's global rugby calendar (2012–2019) that includes test matches between touring Northern Hemisphere nations and home Southern Hemisphere nations. In addition, the global calendar gives Tier 2 nations the opportunity to play Tier 1 nations outside the November International Window, increasing competitiveness from the Tier 2 sides ahead of the 2019 Rugby World Cup in Japan.

Fixtures

8 June

15 June

See also
 2019 World Rugby Pacific Nations Cup
 2019 Rugby World Cup warm-up matches

References

2019
2018–19 in European rugby union
2019 in South American rugby union
June rugby union tests